The 2013–14 Big East Conference men's basketball season began with practices in October 2013, followed by the start of the followed by the start of the 2013–14 NCAA Division I men's basketball season in November. This was the 35th year in the conference's history, but the first as a non-football conference, which officially formed on July 1, 2013.  Conference play started on New Year's Eve 2013, and concluded in March with the 2014 Big East Conference men's basketball tournament at Madison Square Garden in New York.

The original Big East Conference split effective immediately after the conclusion of the 2013 NCAA Division I baseball tournament.  The seven schools that did not sponsor FBS football purchased the "Big East" name and reorganized as a new Big East, while the FBS schools that had not left for other conferences retained the original Big East charter and are now operating as the American Athletic Conference (The American). Both leagues, however, claim the 1979 founding date of the original Big East as their own founding dates. While both offshoot leagues initially claimed the history of the original conference, that has apparently changed, as the basketball history of the original Big East is now claimed by the current Big East, and The American now considers its basketball history to have begun with the conference split. Cincinnati, Louisville, Rutgers, South Florida, and UConn, the five full members of the original Big East that sponsored FBS football before the split, joined with several new members to reorganize as The American.

The nucleus of the conference is the so-called "Catholic 7", the members of the original Big East Conference that do not sponsor FBS football, all Catholic institutions: DePaul, Georgetown, Marquette, Providence, Seton Hall, St. John's, and Villanova.  The seven from the original Big East were joined by Butler and Xavier from the Atlantic 10, and Creighton from the Missouri Valley. The Big East's full membership remained unchanged from the conference's relaunch through the 2019–20 season; the first change to the league's core membership took place on July 1, 2020 when UConn re-joined from The American.

Preseason

() first place votes

Preseason All-Big East teams

Coaches select 8 players
Players in bold are choices for Big East Player of the Year

Rankings

Regular season

Conference matrix
This table summarizes the head-to-head results between teams in conference play. (x) indicates games remaining this season.

Honors and awards

All-Americans

All-Big East awards and teams

Coaches

Postseason

2014 Big East tournament

  March 12–15, 2014 Big East Conference Basketball Tournament, Madison Square Garden, New York.

Bracket

* denotes overtime game

NCAA tournament

* denotes overtime game

References

External links
Big East website